Avalkonda or Avalakonda is a small village near Thugundram in the Gangadhara Nellore mandal of the Chittoor District of Andhra Pradesh state, India.

Manya P Kasturi Reddi and Manya RB Patnaik had done a survey and mapping in 1957.

A Shia-Mosque in Avalakonda village in Chittoor district has got landed property in Pasumarthi, Agavamchori,Gudiyattum and Tippa Samudram of North Arcot district, Madras state. Inams for the mosque are situated in Vellore and Gudiyattum taluqs of North Arcot district, Madras State.

Avalkonda is with 85% Shia population and majority of the families are poor and involved in rolling bidi’s. The Shia community comprises about 5000 people.

References

Villages in Chittoor district